Ecstasia Lenore Sanders (born July 15, 1985) is an American-Canadian actress. She's known for her supporting roles in Final Destination 3 (2006) and Dr. Dolittle 3 (2006).

Early life 
The daughter of performers, Ecstasia Sanders was born in San Diego, California. At an early age, her family moved to Vancouver, British Columbia. Sanders initially appeared in commercials at an early age, before moving to other acting roles. She is currently studying at the Lyric School of Acting.

Filmography

Film

Television

References

External links 
 Ecstasia Sanders on Facebook
 Ecstasia Sanders on Instagram
 

1985 births
Actresses from San Diego
Actresses from Vancouver
Canadian child actresses
Canadian film actresses
Canadian television actresses
Living people
Black Canadian actresses
Canadian people of African-American descent
American emigrants to Canada